Richard Green (born 23 November 1952) is an English former professional footballer who played as a forward.

Career
Born in Scunthorpe, Green played for Appleby Frodingham, Lincoln City, Scunthorpe United, Chesterfield, Notts County, Brigg Town and Barton Town.

Green grew up as a Scunthorpe United fan, and began playing for the Appleby Frodingham works team after leaving school. He trialled at Lincoln City and signed for them, but suffered a knee injury which kept him out for 13 weeks. He then signed for Scunthorpe United following a trialHe transferred to Chesterfield for £23,000, and then to Notts County for £40,000, before returning to Scunthorpe for £25,000. He retired from professional football in 1981 due to a back injury, playing in non-league football for Brigg Town and Barton Town.

Green also played cricket and golf.

References

1952 births
Living people
English footballers
Appleby Frodingham F.C. players
Lincoln City F.C. players
Scunthorpe United F.C. players
Chesterfield F.C. players
Notts County F.C. players
Brigg Town F.C. players
Barton Town F.C. (1880) players
English Football League players
Association football forwards